Barhapur Assembly constituency is one of the 403 constituencies of the Uttar Pradesh Legislative Assembly, India. It is a part of the Bijnor district and one of the five assembly constituencies in the Moradabad Lok Sabha constituency. First election in this assembly constituency was held in 2012 after the "Delimitation of Parliamentary and Assembly Constituencies Order, 2008" was passed in the year 2008.

Wards / Areas
Extent of Barhapur Assembly constituency is KCs Barhapur, Pureni, Barhapur NP of Nagina Tehsil; KCs Kadrabad, Afzalgarh & Afzalgarh M.B. of Dhampur Tehsil.

Members of the Legislative Assembly

Election results

2022

2017

See also

Government of Uttar Pradesh
Moradabad Lok Sabha constituency
List of Vidhan Sabha constituencies of Uttar Pradesh
Bijnor district
Sixteenth Legislative Assembly of Uttar Pradesh
Uttar Pradesh Legislative Assembly
Uttar Pradesh

References

External links
 

Assembly constituencies of Uttar Pradesh
Politics of Bijnor district
Constituencies established in 2008
2008 establishments in Uttar Pradesh